Gerard Patrick Loughlin is an English Roman Catholic theologian and religious scholar. He is Professor of Theology and Religion at the University of Durham, England. He is the author of Telling God's Story: Bible Church and Narrative Theology (1996) and Alien Sex: The Body and Desire in Cinema and Theology (2004).

Biography
A gay Roman Catholic, some of Loughlin's work is in the sub-discipline of queer theology. He is the coeditor (with Jon Davies) of Sex These Days: Essays on Theology, Sexuality and Society (Continuum 1997) and editor of Queer Theology: Rethinking the Western Body (Blackwell, 2007). He serves on the editorial board of Literature and Theology (Oxford University Press) and is co-editor (with Elizabeth Stuart and Kent Brintnall) of Theology and Sexuality (Taylor&Francis).

His master's thesis is titled The Novels of Modernism: The Embodiment of Roman Catholic Modernism in the Literature of Religious Turmoil and Faith at the Turn of the Century, c. 1888–1914. His doctoral thesis, which he wrote under the supervision of John Robinson, is titled Mirroring God's World: A Critique of John Hick's Speculative Theology.

Published works 
 Telling God's Story: Bible, Church and Narrative Theology (Cambridge: Cambridge University Press, 1996)
 (ed. with Jon Davies) Sex These Days: Essays on Theology, Sexuality and Society (Sheffield: Sheffield Academic Press, 1997)
 Alien Sex: The Body and Desire in Cinema and Theology (Oxford: Blackwell, 2004)
 (ed.) Queer Theology: Rethinking the Western Body (Oxford: Blackwell, 2007)

See also 
 Postliberal theology
 Radical orthodoxy

References

External links 
 Faculty profile at Durham University

21st-century British Roman Catholic theologians
Academics of Durham University
Academics of Newcastle University
Alumni of Trinity College, Cambridge
Alumni of the University of Wales, Lampeter
LGBT Roman Catholics
Date of birth missing (living people)
Living people
Queer theologians
Year of birth missing (living people)
20th-century British Roman Catholic theologians